Rhytiphora vestigialis is a species of beetle in the family Cerambycidae. It was described by Francis Polkinghorne Pascoe in 1864. It is known from Australia.

References

vestigialis
Beetles described in 1864